"Gabriellas sång" is a ballad song with music by Stefan Nilsson and lyrics by Py Bäckman. Recorded by Helen Sjöholm & Stefan Nilsson the song charted at Svensktoppen for 68 weeks during the period 24 October 2004-5 February 2006, peaking at second position before leaving the chart. The song also became famous with the film 2004 As It Is in Heaven.

An instrumental recording by Swedish dansband Ingmar Nordströms appeared at the band's 2007 reunion compilation album Saxpartyfavoriter. Py Bäckman herself recorded the song on the 2008 album Sånger från jorden till himmelen.

In 2007 Molly Sandén performed the song during the Diggiloo tour. She also recorded the song as final track for the 2009 album Samma himmel.
In 2009 Hanna Hedlund performed the song, with her choir at Körslaget. Elisabeth Andreassen recorded the song on the 2009 album Spelleman.

References

External links
 Information at Svensk mediedatabas

2004 singles
Elisabeth Andreassen songs
Ingmar Nordströms songs
Swedish songs
Swedish-language songs
Songs written by Py Bäckman
2004 songs